Halten Lighthouse is a coastal lighthouse in the municipality of Frøya in Trøndelag county, Norway. The lighthouse is situated in the now uninhabited fishing village of Halten.  It was first lit in 1875, and it is the northernmost of the chain of lighthouses marking the string of islands called Froan north of Frøya.  The lighthouses include Sula Lighthouse in south, Vingleia Lighthouse, Finnvær Lighthouse, and finally Halten Lighthouse.  The lighthouse emits the morse code letter "T" (—) as a racon signal.

The light emits a white flash of light every four seconds.

The lighthouse tower was originally planned to build a twin-tower lighthouse with the Lista Lighthouse, but the technical development of lighthouses made this unnecessary so it was dismantled and rebuilt here.  A lot of the original interior and exterior are preserved on the lighthouse and the station has been declared a historic preservation site. The station is still in use by the Norwegian Coastal Administration as a base station.

See also

 List of lighthouses in Norway
 Lighthouses in Norway

References

External links
 Norsk Fyrhistorisk Forening 
 

Frøya, Trøndelag
Lighthouses completed in 1875
Lighthouses in Trøndelag